Guishan Island may refer to:
 Guishan Island (Yilan), an island of Taiwan
 Guishan Island (China), an island of China in the Wanshan Archipelago